Tetratheca stenocarpa, commonly known as long pink-bells, is a small shrub in the family Elaeocarpaceae. It is endemic to Victoria in Australia.

Description
It is a prostrate or weeping small shrub which grows to between 1 and 1.5 metres high and 0.5 to 1 metre wide. The leaves are triangular to rounded with toothed edges. These are 5 to 12 millimetres long and wide and are reduced to scales on flowering stems and are often only seen on young growth. The pale to deep lilac-pink (rarely white) bell-shaped flowers appear between July and January in their native range.  These occur in clusters of 1 to 3 on petioles with dense, gland-tipped hairs.

It is similar in appearance to Tetratheca ciliata, but the latter has petioles with only a few gland-tipped hairs.

Taxonomy
The species was first formally described by James Hamlyn Willis in The Victorian Naturalist in 1957.  He discovered the species in 1952 near Gembrook.

Distribution
The species has a restricted distribution, occurring in damp forests in hilly country to the east of Melbourne, on French Island and in a separate population in Gisborne. The species is classified as rare in Victoria. It adapts well to disturbed sites, and is often found on exposed road cuttings.

Cultivation
The species is free-flowering and is suitable for moist shady positions. It can be situated under  established trees or at the top of retaining walls, or used in a cottage garden setting.

References

stenocarpa
Oxalidales of Australia
Flora of Victoria (Australia)
Plants described in 1957